Montgomery Township is one of ten townships in Crawford County, Illinois, USA.  As of the 2010 census, its population was 672 and it contained 301 housing units.

Geography
The Wabash River defines its eastern border.

Cities, towns, villages
 Flat Rock (east quarter)

Unincorporated towns
 Crawfordsville
 Heathsville
 Morea
 Oil Grove
(This list is based on USGS data and may include former settlements.)

Cemeteries
The township contains these twenty-three cemeteries: Allen, Baker, Bartmess, Bennett, Dickerson, Ferrell, Ford, Fuller, Ganies, Green, Green Hill, Hale, Higgins, Johnson, Lackey, Maddox, Morea, Norton, Pleasant View, Seaney, Shaw, Tobey and Wesley Chapel.

Major highways
  Illinois Route 33

Demographics

School districts
 Lawrence County Community Unit District 20
 Palestine Community Unit School District 3
 Robinson Community Unit School District 2

Political districts
 Illinois's 15th congressional district
 State House District 109
 State Senate District 55

References
 
 United States Census Bureau 2007 TIGER/Line Shapefiles
 United States National Atlas

External links
 City-Data.com
 Illinois State Archives

Townships in Crawford County, Illinois
Townships in Illinois